Franciszek Ludwik Cebulak (16 September 1906 – 4 August 1960) was a Polish football midfielder, who represented the Polish national team in the 1936 Berlin Olympic Games.

Cebulak was born in Kraków, and started his career with Wisła Kraków, but his occupation (he was a professional soldier of the Polish Army) forced him to change clubs on several occasions. He played for military clubs from Wilno and Grodno, eventually joining Legia Warsaw, where he played from 1927 until 1936. Then Cebulak moved to Warszawianka Warszawa, where he ended his career in late 1938.

Playing for the Polish national team, Cebulak earned his first cap on 23 August 1931 vs. Romania. Altogether, he was capped five times for Poland, participating in the 1936 Olympic Games. He died in Warsaw.

References

1906 births
1960 deaths
Polish footballers
Poland international footballers
Olympic footballers of Poland
Footballers at the 1936 Summer Olympics
Legia Warsaw players
MKS Cracovia (football) players
Footballers from Kraków
Polish Austro-Hungarians
People from the Kingdom of Galicia and Lodomeria
Association football midfielders
KS Warszawianka players